The 1976 San Jose Earthquakes season was their third in the North American Soccer League, and they finished 
in first place in the Southern Division of the Pacific Conference. In the playoffs, they defeated the Dallas Tornado in the Conference 
Semifinals, 2-0 at Spartan Stadium. The Minnesota Kicks beat the Earthquakes, 3-1 in the Conference Championship 
played at Metropolitan Stadium in Minnesota.

Squad
The 1976 squad

Competitions

NASL

Match results

Season

Playoffs 

* = ShootoutSource:

Standings

Pacific Conference

References

External links
The Year in American Soccer – 1976 | NASL
San Jose Earthquakes Game Results | Soccerstats.us
San Jose Earthquakes Rosters | nasljerseys.com

San Jose Earthquakes seasons
San Jose Earthquakes
San Jose Earthquakes
1976 in sports in California